The East German Women's Volleyball Cup was played from the year 1953 to 1991 , during the existence of East Germany State, This competition comes after the East German Volleyball League.

Competition history 
The East German Cup was not contested by independent sports clubs but only by "BSG" clubs — between 1969 and 1985 . However, between 1981 and 1985 Other sport clubs from non BSG Body was allowed to participate.

Winners list

Honours by club

References

External links
   Volleyball.Verband.de  

Volleyball in East Germany